The Port of Lázaro Cárdenas is the largest Mexican seaport and one of the largest seaports in the Pacific Ocean basin, with an annual traffic capacity of around 25 million tonnes of cargo and 2,200,000 TEU.

In November 2003, the Mexican Navy seized the port from criminal gangs.

Description
Lázaro Cárdenas is home to a deep-water seaport that handles container, dry bulk, and liquid cargo. The port currently has one container terminal, which handled 1.24 million TEU in 2012, and has a total capacity of 2.2 million TEU annually.  APMT has plans to build an additional container terminal that would bring the port's capacity to 3.4 million TEU in 2015 and 6.5 million TEU in 2020.  Cargo moves to and from the port by road and rail equally, with rail service provided exclusively by Kansas City Southern de México. The port is expected to become a major container facility due to congestion at the U.S. ports of Los Angeles and Long Beach and its relative proximity to major cities such as Chicago, Kansas City, and Houston. In preparation for the port's increased capacity, railway and highway infrastructure running north–south through the center of Mexico has been upgraded in recent years to handle the anticipated increase in volume of goods bound for the United States using this transportation corridor.  If a proposed government-backed Pacific port is built at Punta Colonet, Baja California, goods flowing to U.S. states like Arizona and Nevada could bypass the congested Los Angeles region with closer access to those markets, providing increased competition with Lázaro Cárdenas.

Lázaro Cárdenas is the terminus of the Salamanca-Lazaro Cardenas gas pipeline.

Statistics

In 2012, the Port of Lázaro Cárdenas handled 30,671,996 tonnes of cargo and 1,242,777  TEU's, making the busiest cargo port in Mexico and one of the largest container ports in the country.

* figures in tonnes

Terminals
The port of Lázaro Cárdenas has both public and private terminals specialised in:

Public terminals
Grain terminal: 
Multi use terminals: 
Container terminals: 

Private terminals
Mineral terminal: 
Fluid terminal: 
Coal terminal: 
Fertilizer terminal:

References

Lazaro Cardenas, Port of
Coal terminals
Buildings and structures in Michoacán